This page shows the results of the Gymnastics Competition at the 1991 Pan American Games, held from August 2 to August 18 in Havana, Cuba.

Medal table

Artistic gymnastics

Men's competition

All-around

Floor exercise

Parallel bars

Pommel horse

Rings

Horizontal bar

Vault

Team

Women's competition

All-around

Floor exercise

Uneven bars

Balance beam

Vault

Team

Rhythmic gymnastics

Women's competition

All-around

Rope

Hoop

Ball

Clubs

Group

Team

See also
Pan American Gymnastics Championships
South American Gymnastics Championships
Gymnastics at the 1992 Summer Olympics

References
 Sports 123

Events at the 1991 Pan American Games
P
1991